Labrisomus jenkinsi, Jenkin's blenny, is a species of labrisomid blenny endemic to the Galapagos Islands where it seems to inhabit areas with rocky substrates.  This species can reach a length of  TL. The specific name honours Oliver Peebles Jenkins (1850-1935), who was a professor of physiology at Stanford University.

References

jenkinsi
Fish described in 1903
Taxa named by Robert Evans Snodgrass
Taxa named by Edmund Heller